NGC 2527 (also catalogued as NGC 2520) is an open cluster in the constellation Puppis. It was discovered by William Herschel on December 9, 1784. The cluster was also observed by John Herschel on January 7, 1831. He also observed it on February 5, 1837, identifying it as a different object, which was catalogued as NGC 2520. It is a poor cluster and with no central concentration, with Trumpler class III1p.

The core radius of the cluster is 1 parsec (3.3 light years), while the tidal radius is 5.1 parsecs (17 light years) and represents the average outer limit of NGC 2527, beyond which a star is unlikely to remain gravitationally bound to the cluster core. 
37 stars, probable members of the cluster, are located within the central part of the cluster and 96 probable members are located within the angular radius of the cluster. The brightest star members are A-type stars, with the brightest being an A3 star with magnitude 9.38. In the cluster has been detected one white dwarf, with mass . Its age is estimated to be  years and the progenitor star has initial mass circa 3.1 . The turn-off mass of the cluster is at 2.8 . The metallicity of the cluster is -0.01, similar to the solar one.

NGC 2527 lies 3.8 degrees south of Rho Puppis and can be seen with 50mm binoculars as a moderately large, bright patch of haze, with no stars visible with direct vision.

References

External links 

Open clusters
2527
Puppis
Discoveries by William Herschel